Chloromethyl chloroformate (CClO2CH2Cl), also known as palite gas, is a chemical compound developed into gas form and used for chemical warfare during World War I. It is a tearing agent designed to cause temporary blindness. It is a colorless liquid with a penetrating, irritating odor.

Industrially, chloromethyl chloroformate is used to manufacture other chemicals.

References

Lachrymatory agents
Chloroformates